The year 2020 is the 11th year in the history of the Road Fighting Championship, a mma promotion based in South Korea. 2020 starts with ARC 001.

List of events

Title fights

ARC 003 

AfreecaTV ROAD Championship ARC 003  is a mixed martial arts event scheduled to be held by Road FC on August 29, 2020, at the Hot6ix Afreeca Colosseum, Lotte World Tower in Seoul, South Korea.

Background

Fight card

ARC 002 

AfreecaTV ROAD Championship ARC 002  is a mixed martial arts event scheduled to be held by Road FC on July 18, 2020, at the Hot6ix Afreeca Colosseum, Lotte World Tower in Seoul, South Korea.

Background

Fight card

ARC 001 

AfreecaTV ROAD Championship ARC 001  is a mixed martial arts event scheduled to be held by Road FC on May 23, 2020, at the Hot6ix Afreeca Colosseum, Lotte World Tower in Seoul, South Korea.

Background

Fight card

See also 

 List of Road FC events
 List of Road FC champions
 List of current Road FC fighters
 List of current mixed martial arts champions

References 

Road Fighting Championship events
Road FC
Road FC